Junior Josué Sandoval López (born October 13, 1990 in Quimistán) is a Honduran footballer who currently plays for Kalonji Pro-Profile in the United Premier Soccer League.

Career

Youth and College
Sandoval grew up in Alpharetta, Georgia and attended Centennial High School in Roswell, Georgia before playing a year of college soccer at Georgia Perimeter College. He was the Jaguars' leading scorer as a freshman with 29 points on nine goals and 11 assists, and was named to the NJCAA All-Region First Team.

Sandoval also played two seasons with Atlanta FC of the National Premier Soccer League, including their Lamar Hunt US Open Cup match against Charleston Battery in 2009.

Professional
Sandoval left college early and joined Puerto Rico Islanders on February 17, 2010. He made his professional debut on April 18, 2010, in a 2010 CFU Club Championship game against Haitian side Racing des Gonaïves. Puerto Rico loaned Sandoval to Atlanta Silverbacks of the North American Soccer League on March 31, 2011. Puerto Rico ended Sandoval's loan to Atlanta on August 12, 2011.

Sandoval returned to Atlanta and joined the Atlanta Silverbacks Reserves for the first part of the 2012 season. After 4 games, he signed for Marathón in his native Honduras.

In January 2016, Sandoval signed with Jacksonville Armada FC of the NASL.  Following the 2016, he signed to play the 2017 season for California United FC II.

After being released from the Las Vegas Lights following the 2020 USL Championship season, Sandoval returned to Georgia to play with United Premier Soccer League club Kalonji Pro-Profile.

Honors

Puerto Rico Islanders
CFU Club Championship Winner (1): 2010

References

External links
 Georgia Perimeter bio

1990 births
Living people
People from Santa Bárbara Department, Honduras
Association football midfielders
Honduran footballers
Puerto Rico Islanders players
Atlanta Silverbacks players
C.D. Marathón players
Perimeter College at Georgia State University alumni
Expatriate footballers in Puerto Rico
Expatriate soccer players in the United States
USSF Division 2 Professional League players
North American Soccer League players
Jacksonville Armada FC players
Jaguares de Córdoba footballers
Junior college men's soccer players in the United States
Memphis 901 FC players
Las Vegas Lights FC players
USL Championship players
United Premier Soccer League players